Gonzalo O'Farrill y Herrera (1754 in La Habana, Cuba – 1831 in Paris) was a Spanish soldier and politician.

Biography 
He was born in Cuba as the son of O'Farrill y Arriola of Irish descent.
In Spain, Gonzalo became (at the time of King Carlos IV of Spain), a lieutenant general of the Royal Spanish Army, Director of the Military College at Puerto de Santa María, Cadiz, Spain, and a Plenipotentiary Minister representing Spain in the Kingdom of Prussia under King Frederic. He was also a member and President of the Supreme Joint Council of Spain when King Carlos IV went to Bayonne, France to meet with Napoleon I Bonaparte around March 1808.

Minister of War under King Carlos IV of Spain, he was for a few days (3-19 March 1808), between two spells in power of Pedro Cevallos, Prime Minister of Spain under King José I Bonaparte. He remained Minister of War under Bonaparte.
After the collapse of French power in Spain, he emigrated to France and had all his properties in Cuba confiscated.
 
He died in 1831 and is buried in the Père Lachaise Cemetery.
He had married a widow, Ana Rodríguez de Carassa who already had a child, Pedro Miguel Saenz de Santamaría.

Don Gonzalo O'Farrill, the uncle of "la Bella Condesa Cubana" Maria Theresa
The daughter of his sister María-Josefa Josefa O'Farrill y Herrera was the sensual Cuban lady, Maria Teresa Montalvo y O'Farrill, (1771–1812), She became a widow in 1807, aged 36 with two very young daughters, described as the "Santa Cruz" girls, and moved to Madrid. Her Literary Salon at Madrid became very popular with visitors such as the poet Manuel José Quintana and the famous painter Francisco de Goya.

It is said that at the time she was supposed to be the Spanish love of the new Bonaparte family King of Spain, José I Bonaparte, whose wife, Julie Clary, apparently preferred a less risky position and stayed in France with their two daughters.

Maria Teresa Montalvo y O'Farrill died in 1812. The next year when Napoleonic troops suffered successive defeats, her two daughters together with their great uncle Gonzalo O´Farrill, left for Paris. Mercedes Santa Cruz y Montalvo had married around October 1809, aged 20, with French invading General Antoine Christofe Merlin, a. k. a. Merlin de Thionville, then in his early forties, who was Captain General of the Spanish Royal Guards two months before their wedding. Her sister María Josefa de Santa Cruz y Montalvo was married to another "Afrancesado", Pedro Miguel Sáenz de Santa María y Carassa, the step son of General Gonzalo O'Farrill y Herrera, and a member of the State Council of the "new King" José I.

The Spanish-Cuban aristocrats exiled from Madrid to Paris
Maria Mercedes, left her husband French General Merlin de Thionville, and had an affair with Philarète Chasles. She also played hostess to French intellectuals.

Her translation into Spanish from the French of "Viaje a La Habana" had a prologue by the notorious Spanish-Cuban romantic school poet Gertrudis Gomez de Avellaneda, then living in Spain. However her hopes of getting back land, money, houses and titles confiscated by the Spanish Bourbons while she lived in exile, in particular, her appeals around 1845 to Queen Isabella II of Spain for restoration of her titles and properties did not lead anywhere.

See also
 List of prime ministers of Spain

References
http://wwwcirobianchi.blogia.com/2007/121601-dos-habaneras-de-ayer.php
http://www.dtcuba.com/ShowReport.aspx?c=174

The dtcuba URL describes the former palace of the O´Farrill family in La Habana, Cuba, now a hotel. They were Irish Catholics settled in Cuba by the British Crown in 1713 under the Treaty of Utrecht,  as agents for the slave trade, importing Africans to work in Cuban sugar fields.

1754 births
1831 deaths
People from Havana
Cuban people of Irish descent
Prime Ministers of Spain
Economy and finance ministers of Spain
Spanish people of the Napoleonic Wars
Burials at Père Lachaise Cemetery
Afrancesados
Knights of the Golden Fleece of Spain